Maymana is a district of Faryab province, Afghanistan. The seat lies at Maymana.

External links 
 Demographics and population of Faryab Province

Districts of Faryab Province